The National Certification Commission for Acupuncture and Oriental Medicine (NCCAOM) is a non-profit organization in the United States that aims to "establish, assess, and promote recognized standards of competence and safety in acupuncture and Oriental medicine for the protection and benefit of the public."

Overview

The NCCAOM is a member of the National Organization for Competency Assurance (NOCA).  Its certification programs are accredited by the National Commission for Certifying Agencies (NCCA).

Several examinations are offered by the NCCAOM on many of the major branches, skills, and techniques of Oriental Medicine.  Most states in the US require passing of one or more of these tests in order become a licensed practitioner of the associated techniques.

California has its own unique process for licensing handled through the State of California Acupuncture Board (SCAB).

History

The NCCAOM was established in 1982 as a non-profit organization.  It is governed by a Board of Commissioners with seven practitioner members and three public members.

Prior to 1997, the organization was called "the National Commission for the Certification of Acupuncturists (NCCA)".

The following is quoted from the official NCCAOM website:

"The first NCCAOM Comprehensive Written Examination (CWE) in Acupuncture (ACP) was given in March 1985. It was developed during a three-year period with the help of leading acupuncturists throughout the nation. During the development period the NCCAOM followed national guidelines for certification and testing in order to ensure a fair, valid, and reliable examination. The administration of the first examination was a milestone event in the growth of the profession in the United States.

The Practical Examination of Point Location Skills (PEPLS) was added as a component of NCCAOM’s Acupuncture Examination in September 1989. The Clean Needle Technique (CNT) portion was added to the acupuncture written examination two years later. The separately scored CNT examination was merged into the Comprehensive Written Examination in Acupuncture in 1998.

In 1989, the profession asked the NCCAOM to develop a certification program measuring entry-level competency in the practice of Chinese herbology. After three years of research, the organization opened the Credentials Documentation Review (CDR) period for Certification in Chinese Herbology. The first national Comprehensive Written Examination in Chinese Herbology was given in April 1995.

The NCCAOM developed a third certification program in response to requests from the profession. NCCAOM Certification in Asian Bodywork Therapy (ABT) was offered in 1996 through Credentials Documentation Review. CDR for certification in Asian Bodywork Therapy closed in December 1997. The first Comprehensive Written Examination in ABT was given in October 2000.

In December 2003, the NCCAOM began to offer a certification program in Oriental medicine, an umbrella program offering an applicant the opportunity to demonstrate competence in the full range of the Oriental medicine branches.  Certificants of this distinct program earned the designation of Diplomate in Oriental Medicine (Dipl.OM)."

See also

Regulation of acupuncture

References

External links
 http://www.nccaom.org

1982 establishments in Florida
Acupuncture organizations
Traditional Chinese medicine
Alternative medicine organizations